The American Football Association (AFA) was the first attempt in the United States to form an organizing soccer body. It was the second oldest sports league to form, behind the National League of baseball in 1876, as well as being the oldest soccer league in the United States. The Association was formed in 1884 in an attempt to standardize rules and procedures. It was allied with The Football Association, becoming a member on February 22, 1909, at an FA meeting chaired by Charles Clegg, and drew on that organization's approach to the game. As part of its efforts, the AFA directly organized both league and cup competitions as well as overseeing the operations of member leagues. In 1884, it established the American Cup, which for several decades was the highest competitive soccer competition in the United States. The weakness of the AFA lay in its refusal to expand outside the southern New England region. When a movement began to create a national governing body in 1911, the AFA found itself confronting the newly established American Amateur Football Association (AAFA), a body which quickly became national. The AFA argued that it should be recognized by FIFA. However, several member organizations defected from the AFA to the AAFA in 1912. The AAFA quickly moved to reform itself as the United States Football Association, receiving FIFA recognition in 1913. The AFA continued to run the American Cup until 1925, but by that time it had been superseded by the National Challenge Cup and National Amateur Cup.

References

Soccer governing bodies in the United States
1884 establishments in the United States
1925 disestablishments in the United States
Defunct association football governing bodies
Sports organizations established in 1884
Defunct sports governing bodies in the United States
Organizations disestablished in 1925